Vikram Singh Barn (born 2 August 1995), better known as Vikkstar123, is an English YouTuber and Internet personality. He is a member and co-founder of the Sidemen, a British YouTube group.

Early life and education 
Barn was born on 2 August 1995 in Guildford, Surrey, England, where he lived until eight years of age. He later lived in Sheffield where he attended Silverdale School. He is the youngest of three children. Barn was offered a place to study natural sciences at University College London, but he ended up declining the offer in order to pursue his YouTube career full-time.

Career 
Barn joined YouTube in 2010; having played games with his friends he got into watching YouTubers and making videos of their own. Eventually he decided to launch his own channel, stating:

I got involved thinking I might be able to do a little bit better than they were doing, and get involved and have some fun with it. I started recording myself playing Call of Duty: Modern Warfare 2. I started making tutorial videos that people could watch – some of them were for knives and how you could throw them across the map. I made videos showing places where you could throw a knife or tomahawk and get a kill. I thought it would be cool to show off these ridiculous kills.

As his popularity increased, he began to take it more seriously, branching out into Minecraft.

In 2013, he joined the Sidemen, which caused his popularity to rise further. He would later move in with three other members, sharing a house with them from 2014 to 2018, when he announced he was moving out of the Sidemen House. He is also part of the Dream SMP server.

In January 2021, he announced on his channel that he was quitting playing Call of Duty: Warzone due to a proliferation of cheating, saying hackers would be "the death of the game" if it went unfixed. Along with criticism from several other high-profile streamers, the resulting uproar caused Activision to update the game's anti-cheat software.

On February 23, 2023, Barn co-hosted the launch event for the  McLaren MCL60 F1 car alongside F1 podcaster Ariana Bravo.

Other ventures 
Barn is an investor in esports teams and has spoken about how he has invested in London Royal Ravens, a Call of Duty team, speaking of his desire to 'build a blueprint' for the wider popularisation of the sport.

Personal life 
In December 2021, Barn announced his engagement to his longtime girlfriend.

Filmography

Awards and nominations

References

External links 
 
 

1995 births
English male web series actors
English male writers
English people of Indian descent
English YouTubers
Gaming YouTubers
Living people
Minecraft YouTubers
People educated at Silverdale School, Sheffield
People from Sheffield
Video game commentators
YouTube channels launched in 2010
YouTube vloggers
English video bloggers